Waka Kotahi, or the New Zealand Transport Agency, (always abbreviated as NZTA) is a New Zealand Crown entity tasked with promoting safe and functional transport by land, including the responsibility for driver and vehicle licensing, and administering the New Zealand state highway network. 

It was established as the New Zealand Transport Agency on 1 August 2008 by the Land Transport Management Amendment Act 2008, merging Transit New Zealand with Land Transport New Zealand.  means 'one vessel' and is intended to convey the concept of "travelling together as one".

Public data access
The transport agency stores registration, licensing and warrant of fitness details for any road-registered vehicle within New Zealand, including cars, motorbikes, trailers, trucks and earthmoving or agricultural machinery. Any member of the public can query the transport agency's database by making a request using the licence plate or VIN at an NZ Post outlet, or by using a vehicle checking website.

Road signage
Road signs in New Zealand fall under the authority of the transport agency and are prescribed in the Traffic Control Devices (TCD) Manual.

Awards
The transport agency has been recognised, alongside its partners, by industry and professional bodies for innovation and best practice. Some of the awards received include:
 The transport agency's Zero Harm Reporting Tool won the award for the institute's HR technology category for 2016.
 The Highway and Network Operations Environment and Urban Design team took out the 2015 New Zealand Institute of Landscape Architects Award for landscape publications.
 The transport agency and Hamilton consultancy Bloxam, Burnett and Olliver were the winners at the 2015 Planning Institute Awards. Planning practices for the Huntly section of the Waikato Expressway saw them jointly claim the Best Practice Award for District and Regional Planning, and the overall Nancy Northcroft Supreme Best Practice Award.
 Three gold Effie Awards for the Legend ('Ghost Chips') drink-driving campaign. 
 In 2014 the transport agency received worldwide recognition for road safety advertising, with their advertising agency, Clemenger BBDO, picking up several prestigious national and international awards for 'Mistakes' and 'Blazed' at the Cannes Lions.
 The 2012 Civils Demolition award for the Newmarket Viaduct. 
 The 2012 Excellence in Engineering for Safety award for the KiwiRAP star ratings system.
 IT Project of the Year at the 2012 ITEX Computerworld Awards for the Business Continuity Programme. 
 Craig Soutar won Chief Information Officer of the Year in 2013.
 2012 WriteMark Plain English Awards and 2013 Public Relations Institute of NZ Awards for the changes to the give way rules campaign and the Manawatu Gorge road closure communications. 
 An award for 'Restoring native plant life to road corridors' at the 2012 New Zealand Plant Conservation Network awards.

Board

The initial transport agency board was criticised by the National Party-led opposition in July 2008 as being "stacked" with political appointees of the Labour Party-led government. A National Party-led government was formed after the general election later in 2008, and a number of board members were reappointed or replaced.

In January 2019, three members of the board of directors resigned, about six weeks after the resignation of Chief Executive Fergus Gammie. They were Adrienne Young-Cooper, Chris Ellis and Fran Wilde. Minister of Transport Phil Twyford said the agency had been "going through a massive change process", with its compliance work in the issuing of vehicle Warrant of Fitnesses under review.

Mark Ratcliffe, former head of telco Chorus, was appointed Interim Chief Executive. Nicole Rosie, former CE of WorkSafe New Zealand, replaced him as chief executive mid-February 2020.

On 26 April 2019, chairman Michael Stiassny announced his resignation. On 11 June 2019, Brian Roche commenced his second term as chairman of Waka Kotahi; Roche had previously been the inaugural chairman from 2008.

Kane Patena was appointed the first Director of Land Transport for the transport agency from 1 April 2021.

References

External links

 
 NZTA's education portal
 NZTA's Feet First programme

New Zealand Crown agents
2008 establishments in New Zealand
Transport authorities in New Zealand